Kathleen Drew may refer to:
 Kathleen Mary Drew-Baker, British phycologist
 Kathleen Drew (politician), member of the Washington Senate